The Twelfth United States Army Group was the largest and most powerful United States Army formation ever to take to the field, commanding four field armies at its peak in 1945: First United States Army, Third United States Army, Ninth United States Army and Fifteenth United States Army. Formed eight days after the Normandy landings, it initially controlled the First and the Third US Armies. Through various configurations in 1944 and 1945, the Twelfth US Army Group controlled the majority of American forces on the Western Front. It was commanded by General Omar Bradley with its headquarters established in London on 14 July 1944.

During the first week of the Normandy landings and the Battle of Normandy, Bradley's First US Army formed the right wing of the Allied lines. They were joined during July by the Third US Army, under the command of General George S. Patton, to form the Twelfth Army Group.   Twelfth Army Group became operational in France on 1 August 1944.  With General Omar Bradley assuming command of the Twelfth Army Group, Lieutenant General Courtney Hodges assumed command of the First Army.

Until 1 September 1944, when General Eisenhower assumed overall command of the Allied land forces in Northwest Europe, the US forces in Normandy were included with the British Second Army and the First Canadian Army in the British headquarters formation 21st Army Group, commanded by General Montgomery.

After the breakout from the beach-head at Normandy, the Twelfth Army Group formed the center of the Allied forces on the Western Front. To the north was the British 21st Army Group (the First Canadian and British Second)) and, to the south, advancing from their landing on the Mediterranean coast, was the Sixth United States Army Group (Seventh United States Army and French First Army).

As the Twelfth advanced through Germany in 1945, it grew to control four United States field armies: the First, the Third, the Ninth and the Fifteenth. By V-E Day, the Twelfth Army Group was a force that numbered over 1.3 million men.

Twelfth Army Group was inactivated on 12 July 1945 upon the departure of General Bradley to become Director of the Veterans Administration.  Its subordinate elements then became directly subordinate to United States Army Europe.

Order of Battle – 8 May 1945

  12th Army Group – General Omar N. Bradley
  First Army – General Courtney H. Hodges
  78th Infantry Division – Major General Edwin P. Parker Jr.
  VII Corps – Lieutenant General J. Lawton Collins
  9th Infantry Division – Major General Louis A. Craig
  9th Armored Division – Major General John W. Leonard
  69th Infantry Division – Major General Emil F. Reinhardt
  104th Infantry Division – Major General Terry de la Mesa Allen Sr.
  Third Army – General George S. Patton, Jr.
  1st Infantry Division – Major General Clift Andrus
  2nd Infantry Division – Major General Walter M. Robertson
  70th Infantry Division – Major General Allison J. Barnett
  97th Infantry Division – Brigadier General Milton B. Halsey
  III Corps – Major General James Van Fleet
  4th Infantry Division – Major General Harold W. Blakeley
  14th Armored Division – Major General Albert C. Smith
  99th Infantry Division – Major General Walter E. Lauer
  V Corps – Major General Clarence R. Huebner
  16th Armored Division – Brigadier General John L. Pierce
  XII Corps – Major General Stafford LeRoy Irwin
  4th Armored Division – Major General William M. Hoge
  5th Infantry Division – Major General Albert E. Brown
  11th Armored Division – Major General Holmes E. Dager
  26th Infantry Division – Major General Willard S. Paul
  90th Infantry Division – Major General Herbert L. Earnest
  XX Corps – Major General Walton H. Walker
  13th Armored Division – Major General John Millikin
  65th Infantry Division – Major General Stanley E. Reinhart
  71st Infantry Division – Major General Willard G. Wyman
  80th Infantry Division – Major General Horace L. McBride
  Ninth Army – Lieutenant General William H. Simpson
  2nd Armored Division – Major General Isaac D. White
  VIII Corps – Major General Troy H. Middleton
  6th Armored Division – Major General Robert W. Grow
  76th Infantry Division – Major General William R. Schmidt
  87th Infantry Division – Major General Frank L. Culin Jr.
  89th Infantry Division – Major General Thomas D. Finley
  XIII Corps – Major General Alvan C. Gillem, Jr.
  30th Infantry Division – Major General Leland S. Hobbs
  35th Infantry Division – Major General Paul W. Baade
  83rd Infantry Division – Major General Robert C. Macon
  84th Infantry Division – Major General Alexander R. Bolling
  102nd Infantry Division – Major General Frank A. Keating
  XVI Corps – Major General John B. Anderson
  29th Infantry Division – Major General Charles H. Gerhardt
  75th Infantry Division – Major General Ray E. Porter
  79th Infantry Division – Major General Ira T. Wyche
  95th Infantry Division – Major General Harry L. Twaddle
  XIX Corps – Major General Raymond S. McLain
  3rd Armored Division – Brigadier General Doyle O. Hickey
  8th Armored Division – Major General John M. Devine
  Fifteenth Army – Lieutenant General Leonard T. Gerow
  66th Infantry Division – Major General Herman F. Kramer
  106th Infantry Division – Major General Donald A. Stroh
  XVIII Airborne Corps – Major General Matthew B. Ridgway
  5th Armored Division – Major General Lunsford E. Oliver
  7th Armored Division – Major General Robert W. Hasbrouck
  8th Infantry Division – Major General Bryant E. Moore
  82nd Airborne Division – Major General James M. Gavin
  101st Airborne Division – Major General William C. Lee
  XXII Corps – Major General Ernest N. Harmon
  17th Airborne Division – Major General William M. Miley
  94th Infantry Division – Major General Harry J. Malony
  XXIII Corps – Major General Hugh J. Gaffey
  28th Infantry Division – Major General Norman D. Cota

Source: Bradley, Omar, A Soldier's Story, New York: Henry Holt and Company (1950), pp. 557–561

References and notes

External links 
 Military situation maps produced by the Engineering Section of the 12th Army Group – Library of Congress
 Omar Nelson Bradley, Lt. General FUSAG 12TH AG – Omar Bradley's D-Day June 6, 1944 Maps restored, preserved and displayed at Historical Registry

12
Military units and formations established in 1944
Military units and formations disestablished in 1945